Vintcent is a surname. Notable people with the surname include:

Charles Vintcent (1866–1943), South African cricketer
Nevill Vintcent (1902–1942), South African aviator
Vintcent van der Bijl (born 1948), South African cricketer

See also
Vincent

Masculine given names